Christ Church East Central is a constituency in the Christ Church area of Barbados. Since 2003, it has been represented in the House of Assembly of the Barbadian Parliament by Ronald Jones. Jones is a member of the DLP.

Since its founding in 1981, Christ Church East Central has been a marginal constituency between the BLP and the DLP.

Boundaries 
The constituency runs from the junction of the ABC Highway and Highway R (the Upton-Kent Road) in a southerly then easterly direction. It continues to highway 6 and then runs in an easterly direction along the middle of Highway 6 to its junction with the Bannatyne-Kingsland Road. From there, it runs in a southerly direction along the middle of the Bannatyiie-Kingsland Road to the Kingsland-Gall Hill Road. Then in a south-easterly direction along the middle of the Kingsland-Gall Hill Road to its junction with Water Street. Next, it runs in an easterly direction along the middle of Water Street to its junction with Highway T (the Lodge Road-Oistins Hill Road). Then in a southerly direction along the middle of Highway T to its junction with Church Hill Road. Then in an easterly direction along the middle of Church Hill Road to its junction with Windy Ridge Road. Then in a south easterly direction along the middle of Windy Ridge Road to its junction with Highway 7 (the Airport-Oistins Road) at Thornbury Hill. Then in a northeasterly direction along the middle of Highway 7 to its junction with Highway S (the Providence-Balls Road).Then in a northerly direction along the middle of Highway S to its junction with the ABC Highway. Then in a south westerly direction along the middle of the ABC Highway to its junction with Highway 6 (the Balls-St Patrick Road) at the Henry Forde Round-a-bout. Then in an easterly direction along the middle of Highway 6 (the Balls-St Patrick Road) to its junction with Highway Q (the Balls-Lower Greys Road). Then in a north easterly direction along the middle of Highway Q to its junction with Highway R (the Pilgrim Place-St. Davids Road). Then along the middle of Highway R to its junction with an unclassified road west of Edeys Village leading to Small Ridge and Bannatyne Gardens. Then in a southerly, easterly then southerly direction along the middle of the said unclassified road to where it meets the Bannatyne Gardens Road. Then in a south westerly direction along the middle of the Bannatyne Gardens Road to its junction with Highway V (the Bannatyne-St Davids Road). Then in a north-westerly direction along the middle of Highway V to its junction with Highway R. Then in a westerly direction along the middle of Highway R to its junction with the ABC Highway (the starting point).

History

Members of Parliament

Notes

References 

Constituencies of the Parliament of Barbados
Christ Church, Barbados
1981 establishments in Barbados
Constituencies established in 1981